High Grass Circus is a 1976 National Film Board of Canada documentary film co-directed by Tony Ianzelo and Torben Schioler, exploring life in the Royal Brothers' traveling circus. It was shot in the spring and summer of 1975 and part of 1976, and had a budget of $62,008.

It received the Golden Sheaf Award for Best Film of the Festival at the Yorkton Film Festival, the Award of Excellence from the Film Advisory Board, and it was nominated as Best Documentary Feature at the 50th Academy Awards.

Following its Oscar nomination, it was acquired by CBC-TV, which broadcast it on July 12, 1978. It was subsequently sold to television networks in New Zealand, the UK, South Africa and Yugoslavia. A nine-minute cut-down version of the film, entitled Little Big Top, played in Canadian theatres in late 1977, including a 15-week run in Vancouver. In August 1980, PBS acquired the film along with seven other NFB documentaries and broadcast them on 11 of its stations.

References

Works cited

External links

Watch High Grass Circus at NFB.ca (requires Adobe Flash)

1976 films
1976 documentary films
Canadian documentary films
English-language Canadian films
Documentary films about circus performers
Films directed by Tony Ianzelo
Films produced by Colin Low (filmmaker)
National Film Board of Canada documentaries
1970s English-language films
1970s Canadian films